The 2018–19 Fairleigh Dickinson Knights men's basketball team represented Fairleigh Dickinson University during the 2018–19 NCAA Division I men's basketball season. The team was led by sixth-year head coach Greg Herenda. The Knights played their home games at the Rothman Center in Hackensack, New Jersey as members of the Northeast Conference.

The Knights compiled a 21–14 record and went 12–6 in NEC play to finish in a tie for first place. They defeated Wagner, Robert Morris, and Saint Francis (PA) to capture the NEC tournament championship as the 2-seed. By winning the NEC tournament, the Knights received the conference's automatic bid and defeated Prairie View A&M in the First Four Round of the NCAA tournament in Dayton, OH. The Knights then lost to  1-seed Gonzaga.

Previous season 
The Knights finished the 2017–18 season 13–18, 9–9 in NEC play to finish in a tie for sixth place. They defeated Saint Francis (PA) in the quarterfinals of the NEC tournament before losing in the semifinals to LIU Brooklyn.

Preseason 
In a poll of league coaches at the NEC media day, the Knights were picked to finish in second place. Senior guard Darian Anderson was named the preseason All-NEC team.

Roster

Schedule and results

|-
!colspan=9 style=| Exhibition

|-
!colspan=9 style=| Non-conference regular season  
  

|-
!colspan=9 style=| NEC regular season

|-
!colspan=9 style=| NEC tournament

|-
!colspan=9 style=| NCAA tournament

References

Fairleigh Dickinson Knights men's basketball seasons
Fairleigh Dickinson
Fairleigh Dickinson
Fairleigh Dickinson
Fairleigh Dickinson